Fearless is the fourth studio album by Canadian country music singer Terri Clark. It was released in September 2000 via Mercury Nashville. The album produced three singles in "A Little Gasoline", "No Fear" and "Getting There", which respectively reached No. 13, 27, and 41 on the Billboard country charts. A fourth single, "Empty", was only released in Canada. Clark produced the album with Steuart Smith, with assistance from Keith Stegall on "No Fear" and "A Little Gasoline".

Critical reception

Thom Jurek of Allmusic referred to the album as "an attempt at breaking out of the bonds of contemporary country without leaving the music entirely behind" and praising Clark's songwriting.

Track listing

Personnel
Adapted from liner notes.

Beth Nielson Chapman - background vocals (tracks 2, 12)
Terri Clark - lead vocals (all tracks), background vocals (tracks 1, 3, 5, 8-11), acoustic guitar (track 12)
Dan Dugmore - electric guitar (track 1), pedal steel guitar (tracks 1, 2, 5, 7, 9)
Stuart Duncan - fiddle (track 5)
Larry Franklin - fiddle (track 7)
Pam Gadd - banjo (tracks 2, 6, 7)
Emmylou Harris - background vocals (track 6)
B. James Lowry - acoustic guitar (tracks 1, 7)
Greg Morrow - drums (tracks 1, 7), percussion (track 1)
Steve Nathan - synthesizer (track 4)
Shawn Pelton - drums (tracks 2-6, 8-11), drum loops (track 2, 4, 8), percussion (tracks 2-5, 9-11)
Gary Prim - Hammond B-3 organ (tracks 1, 7), piano (track 7)
Michael Rhodes - bass guitar (tracks 2-4, 6, 8-11)
Chris Rodriguez - background vocals (tracks 3, 10)
Tammy Rogers - background vocals (track 7)
John Wesley Ryles - background vocals (tracks 1, 7)
Steuart Smith - accordion (tracks 1, 6), acoustic guitar (tracks 2-4, 6, 10, 11), baritone guitar (tracks 4, 10, 11), bouzouki (tracks 5, 8, 10), electric guitar (all tracks except 11 & 12), Hammond B-3 organ (tracks 2, 8, 11), harmonica (tracks 3, 8), hi-string acoustic guitar (track 12), mandolin (tracks 2, 8, 11), piano (tracks 4, 5), synthesizer (tracks 4, 11), Wurlitzer (tracks 2, 3, 5, 11)
Benmont Tench - Hammond B-3 organ (tracks 3, 5, 9, 10), Wurlitzer (track 8)
Biff Watson - 12-string acoustic guitar (track 10), acoustic guitar (tracks 2, 5, 6, 8, 9)
Dennis Wilson - background vocals (track 9)
Glenn Worf - bass guitar (tracks 1, 5, 7)
Jonathan Yudkin - fiddle (track 6), strings (track 12), string arrangements (track 12)

Charts

Weekly charts

Year-end charts

References

2000 albums
Terri Clark albums
Mercury Nashville albums